The École polytechnique de l'université de Lorraine, or Polytech Nancy is a French grande école located in Nancy. It was created in 1960 under the name of ISIN, was renamed Ecole Supérieure des Sciences et Technologies de l'Ingénieur de Nancy or ESSTIN in 1985. It merged into the University of Lorraine in 2012, and joined the Polytech Group in 2017. The school teaches to about 800 students at any given time, and, as of 2013, more than 4500 engineers have graduated.

The 5-year engineering formation delivers a Master of Science and includes a 2-year specialisation. At the end of the third year, the students have to choose between the 2 main axis of the formation : GEMMES (Mechanical engineering) or ISYS (Systems engineering), then they pick their specialty for the last year.

Specialization
 GEMMES : Energy, Materials, Mechanical, Environmental and Structural Engineering
 MFE : Fluid Mechanics and Energetics
 MS : Materials and Structures
 Optional specialisation in Health Technologies Engineering : study of medical technologies
 IE :Industry and Environment
 ISYS : Systems Engineering
 CSS : Systems Command and Monitoring (e.g. Automation)
 MSS : Industrial Maintenance and Systems Security
 SRI : Communication and Network Engineering

References

External links
  ESSTIN's history

Grandes écoles
Universities and colleges in Nancy, France
Educational institutions established in 1960
University of Lorraine
1960 establishments in France